History of the Future may refer to:

Art
The History of the Future, a 2012 artwork by The Propeller Group

Books
A History of the Future, an 1830s science-fiction novel by Adam Mickiewicz, mainly lost
A History of the Future (novel), a 2014 novel by James Howard Kunstler
Franklin Furnace & the Spirit of the Avant-Garde: A History of the Future, by Toni Sant 2011
Volume 4: A History of the Future, a 2011 compilation of Air (comics)

Film, TV and radio
"The History of the Future", a 2004 episode of the BBC radio comedy The Museum of Everything
The History of the Future, a 2012 BBC radio series presented by Juliet Gardiner
History of the Future Museum, a Star Trek museum
A History of the Future (TV series), a 2019 documentary series

Music
History of the Future, working title for the Yes album Talk
History of the Future, a 2001 album by Ricky Skaggs
History of the Future, a 2013 compilation album by The Orb